Lycée Jules-Ferry may refer to:
Lycée Jules-Ferry (Cannes), Cannes
Lycée Jules-Ferry (Coulommiers), Coulommiers, Seine-et-Marne
Lycée Jules-Ferry (Montpellier), Montpellier
Lycée Jules-Ferry (Paris)
, Saint-Dié-des-Vosges
Lycée Jules-Ferry (Versailles), Versailles